Aqeel (Arabic: عَقِيْل) is an Arabic male given name, which means "knowledgeable", "intelligent", or "wise".  An alternative spelling is Aqil. The name may refer to:

Historical
Aqil ibn Abi Talib ( – 670 or 683), cousin and companion of the prophet Muhammad; brother of Ali

Modern
Aqeel Abbas Jafari (born 1957), Pakistani writer
Aqeel Ahmed (director) (born 1987), British filmmaker
Aqeel Ahmed (cricketer) (born 1982), Pakistani cricketer
Aqeel Karim Dhedhi (born 1957), Pakistani businessman
Aqeel Khan (born 1980), Pakistani tennis player
Aqeel Rehman (born 1985), Austrian squash player
Aqiil Gopee  (born 1997), Mauritian writer and poet
DJ Aqeel, Indian DJ, singer and composer

References

Arabic masculine given names